Điện Biên is a province in the Northwest region of Vietnam. It is bordered by Lai Châu to the northeast, Sơn La to the southeast, Pu'er City, Yunnan, China, to the northwest, and Phongsaly province in Laos to the west. The province covers an area of 9,541 square kilometres and as of 2019 it had a population of 598,856 people.

History
 
The name "Điện Biên" means "stable frontier" (referring to Điện Biên's location on the border between Lan Xang and Vietnam). Điện Biên has various ancient monuments including the caves Thẩm Khương, as well as Thẩn Búa in Tuần Giáo. The original settlers were the Ai Lao or Tai people who are a direct ancestor of Lao people in Laos today. The names of some villages and towns still use words of Tai origin, such as Mường (city) and Tham (cave).

In the 9th and 10th centuries, the Lự in Mường Thanh were the most developed in the area and controlled Sìn Hồ, Mường Lay, and Tuần Giáo.

In the 11th and 12th centuries, Tai people (not to be confused with the Thai people of Thailand) from Mường Ôm and Mường Ai occupied Mường Lò in Nghĩa Lộ and  Mường Thanh in Điện Biên. They eventually gained control of the whole area between Mường Lò and Mường Thanh (Điện Biên).

Climate
Điện Biên province has a humid subtropical climate (Köppen Cwa).

Administrative divisions
Điện Biên is subdivided into 10 district-level sub-divisions:

They are further subdivided into five commune-level towns (or townlets), 116 rural communes, and nine wards.

Places in Điện Biên
 Mường Thanh Valley

References

External links

 
Northwest (Vietnam)
Provinces of Vietnam